Copestylum satur, the spotted-wing bromeliad fly, is a species of syrphid fly in the family Syrphidae.

References

Eristalinae
Articles created by Qbugbot
Insects described in 1877